Face the Nation is an Australian panel discussion television program which aired on Melbourne station GTV-9 from 20 July 1958 to 10 May 1959. Political matters were often discussed. The chairman of the panel was Roland Strong.

TV listings list it as being a live programme.

Guests
 Sir Robert Menzies, Prime Minister
 Sir Arthur Warner, Minister for Transport
 Sir Macfarlane Burnet, virologist
 Dr Kenneth Adamson, Federal President of the Australian Dental Association
 Selwyn Porter, Chief Commissioner of Victoria Police

References

External links
 

Nine Network original programming
1958 Australian television series debuts
1959 Australian television series endings
Australian live television series
Australian non-fiction television series
Black-and-white Australian television shows
English-language television shows